The Ireland cricket team toured India in March 2020 to play three Twenty20 International (T20I) matches against Afghanistan. On 11 January 2020, the Afghanistan Cricket Board (ACB) confirmed the fixtures for the three T20I matches.

Originally, the tour had a one-off Test match on the itinerary. However, due to financial constraints with Cricket Ireland, the Test was not included on the tour schedule. Ireland previously toured India in February and March 2019 to play Afghanistan, a series that included the first Test match to be played between the two teams. Afghanistan won the one-off Test match by seven wickets to record their first victory in Test cricket. Prior to the tour, Asghar Afghan was reappointed as Afghanistan's captain across all three formats of international cricket.

The first fixture of the tour was the 1,000th match played by Ireland across all formats, since they played a two-day match in September 1855. Afghanistan won the rain-affected match, extending their record to eleven consecutive wins against Ireland. Afghanistan won the second match by 21 runs, to take an unassailable lead in the series. The third and final match of the series finished in a tie with Ireland winning the Super Over, with Afghanistan winning the series 2–1. It was Ireland's first win against Afghanistan in a T20I match since they beat them in the final of the 2013 ICC World Twenty20 Qualifier.

Squads

Stephen Doheny was added to Ireland's squad as a replacement for Gary Wilson, after Wilson became ill ahead of the series.

T20I series

1st T20I

2nd T20I

3rd T20I

References

External links
 Series home at ESPN Cricinfo

2020 in Irish cricket
2020 in Afghan cricket
International cricket competitions in 2019–20
International cricket tours of India
Afghan cricket tours of India 
Irish cricket tours of India